United Nations Security Council resolution 473, adopted unanimously on 13 June 1980, after recalling resolutions 392 (1976), 417 (1977), 418 (1977), 454 (1979) and 466 (1980) and letters from the Committee for South Africa, the council expressed its concern and condemned South Africa for the killing of protesters, including schoolchildren, opposed to apartheid.

The resolution went on to call for the release of political prisoners, including Nelson Mandela, under a proposed amnesty. It also expressed sympathy with victims of the violence, calling for an end to apartheid legislation that affects the news media, trials, organisations and equal opportunities. The council also called on South Africa to cease military attacks on other countries, and encourages other Member States to reinforce the arms embargo on the country.

See also
 List of United Nations Security Council Resolutions 401 to 500 (1976–1982)
 South Africa under apartheid

References
Text of the Resolution at undocs.org

External links
 

 0473
1980 in South Africa
 0473
June 1980 events